Boynton Beach Mall is an enclosed  shopping mall in Boynton Beach, Florida, owned by Washington Prime Group, who assumed ownership of the mall and 97 others after its spinoff from Simon Property Group in 2014, which in turn took over from developer Edward J. DeBartolo Corporation following the 1996 DeBartolo-Simon merger. Its tenants include Macy's, Dillard's Clearance Center, JCPenney, Christ Fellowship, Cinemark, and about 135 specialty stores and eateries.

History
Originally built by the Edward J. DeBatolo Corp. in October 1985 with a similar layout to Coral Square, the mall's original anchors were J. C. Penney (opened October 2), and Lord & Taylor (opened October 7, along with another at Miami International Mall), with the mall itself opening on October 10, 1985, followed by Burdines on November 2. This was followed by Jordan Marsh in 1986, similarly to Coral Square, which was dedicated in 1984. A Macy's was added in 1989, on the northeast pad.

In the mall's center court, there used to be a fountain with a large monarch butterfly statue atop a waterfall, which fell in short bursts so as to create an unusual sound. The shopping mall also had a running theme with its additional two smaller bronze fountains, one featuring a boy and his dog playing with a garden hose, and at the other end of the mall a girl pouring water out of a bucket into the fountain. The mall was renovated in 2001, and all three fountains were removed, which was likewise done at the same time at Miami International Mall. The statue of the girl still remains at one end of the mall even though it is completely dry. The sculptures were designed by contracted sculpturist Norman Mansson.

Mervyn's, which replaced Lord & Taylor in 1991, was sold to Dillard's in 1997 as their men's store and built a women's store in 1999 on the opposite side of the original Macy's. Meanwhile, Jordan Marsh then became Sears in 1992. The arrival of Sears and dual Dillard's format were also done at Pembroke Lakes Mall. As Burdines became Macy's in 2005, the original Macy's was also demolished in that year to make way for a new lifestyle center.

On May 4, 2007, Muvico Theaters opened a 14-screen movie theater at the mall's new lifestyle center addition. In March 2009, Muvico sold the theater to Cinemark. Several eateries and stores were also opened on the former site of the mall's original Macy's.

In summer 2010, a new trackless train from Beston opened. Soon afterwards in 2011, Dillard's also converted the men's store (the former Lord & Taylor/Mervyn's building) into a clearance center, leaving the former women's store behind to be purchased by Christ Fellowship in 2012, it opened in 2014. The train closed in 2015 to make way for Safari Rides. In 2017, The Disney Store closed.

In 2013, Small Fry Carousel was closed to make way for a bungee jumping attraction near the Dillard's clearance center. H&M opened a 15,000-square-foot store in summer 2015.

On November 8, 2018, Sears announced that its store at the mall would be closing as part of a plan to shut down 40 locations nationwide. The store closed in February 2019, leaving The Gardens Mall as the only Sears remaining in all of Palm Beach County.

Anchors
Current:
 Christ Fellowship (opened in former Dillard's Women's) (2014–Present)
 Macy's (former Burdines location)    (2005–Present)
 Macy's Backstage (inside Macy's)   (2017–present)
 Dillard's (opened in the former Mervyn's location, became Clearance Center in 2012)    (2002–Present)
 J.C. Penney {original tenant} (1985–present)  
 Cinemark (opened in 2007 on former Macy's site as Muvico, became Cinemark in 2009)
Former:
 Jordan Marsh {original tenant} (closed in 1991, became Sears in 1992)(1986-1991)
 Mervyn's (opened in former Lord & Taylor in 1991, closed in 1999 became Dillard's Men's)
 Lord & Taylor {original tenant}(closed in 1991, became Mervyns)
 Burdines {original tenant} (became Macy's in 2005) (1985-2005)
 Sears (opened in former Jordan Marsh in 1992, closed in 2019)
 Dillard's (women's store opened 2002, closed 2012,  space became Christ Fellowship Boynton Beach campus in 2014)    (2002-2012)
 Macy's (Opened in 1991 in new building, demolished when Macy's relocated for former Burdines in 2005, site became Cinemark)    (1991-2005)

References

External links
 

Washington Prime Group
Shopping malls in Palm Beach County, Florida
Shopping malls established in 1985
Boynton Beach, Florida
1985 establishments in Florida